The Libertarian Party (LIBER) is a libertarian Brazilian political organization listed as a political party by the Superior Electoral Court (Portuguese: Tribunal Superior Eleitoral; TSE). The party was founded on June 20, 2009, in Belo Horizonte.

The concept of the Brazilian Libertarian Party first surfaced in 2005 among users of the Orkut social networking service. LIBER's program and statutes were published in the Federal Official Gazette in January 2010. The party has organized demonstrations on the Rio de Janeiro waterfront against the PNDH 3 bill, and have also participated in liberal forums and seminars, such as the Austrian Economy Seminar and the Liberdade e Democracia Forum in Belo Horizonte.

The Libertarians are affiliated with the Inter-libertarians, an international association of Libertarian parties and organizations. Because of its strong defense of a market economy with minimal state interference, the party has been associated with the new right. Although their stances on economic issues tend to lean right, on social issues libertarianism tends to be left-wing. Traditionally, libertarian theory is related to the classical liberal tradition, whose proponents include John Locke, David Hume, Adam Smith and Immanuel Kant.

Ideology 

The party promotes economic libertarianism, drawing inspiration from the Russian-American writer and philosopher Ayn Rand, the American economist Murray Rothbard, and the American philosopher Robert Nozick. It supports free-market policies and is ideologically informed by Austrian-British writer and philosopher Friedrich Hayek and Austrian-American economist and historian Ludwig von Mises. The party identifies with the Austrian School.

In an interview with Instituto Pais Melhor, the former president of LIBER Bernardo Santoro defined libertarianism as "a political philosophy based on individual sovereignty, non-initiation of aggression, and self-ownership." In this definition, a man is the owner of his body and mixes his work with nature, which creates a legal system with private property ownership and an economic system with a free market and free interaction between individuals."

Registration process 

The party is not registered with the Superior Electoral Court, as they do not have the required 500,000 supporters.

Directories 
Note: The following table is sorted alphabetically by state names.

See also 

 Anarcho-capitalism
 Freedom of speech
 List of political parties in Brazil
 Minarchism

References

External links
 Brazilian Libertarian Party Website

2009 establishments in Brazil
Anarcho-capitalist organizations
Liberal parties in Brazil
Libertarian parties
Minarchism
Political parties established in 2009
Political parties in Brazil